Nexosa hexaphala is a species of moth of the  family Tortricidae. It is found in Sri Lanka and Vietnam.

References

Moths described in 1912
Nexosa
Moths of Asia
Moths of Sri Lanka